CBCX-FM is a Canadian radio station, which broadcasts Radio-Canada's Ici Musique network at 89.7 FM in Calgary, Alberta. CBCX's studios are located in the Cambrian Wellness Centre, northwest of downtown Calgary, while its transmitter is located at Old Banff Coach Road and 85 Street Southwest in Calgary.

The station also has a class A rebroadcaster CBCX-FM-1 in Edmonton at 101.1 MHz, at 3,931 watts.

Both of the station's transmitters were licensed in 2002 and launched in early 2003.

On January 20, 2012, it was announced that Radio-Canada have plans to close down the AM transmitter of Edmonton's Première Chaîne outlet, CHFA, and swap frequencies between its nested repeater in Edmonton, CHFA-10-FM (101.1), and the much-stronger CBCX-FM-1 (90.1). This application was approved on June 22, 2012.

References

External links
 

Bcx
Bcx
Bcx
Franco-Albertan culture
Radio stations established in 2002
2002 establishments in Alberta